The women's 200 metre freestyle competition of the swimming events at the 1967 Pan American Games took place on 26 July at the Pan Am Pool. The last Pan American Games champion was Robyn Johnson of US.

This race consisted of four lengths of the pool, all in freestyle.

Results
All times are in minutes and seconds.

Heats

Final 
The final was held on July 26.

References

Swimming at the 1967 Pan American Games
Pan